El Maíllo is a village and municipality in the province of Salamanca, in the Autonomous Community of Castilla y Leon, Spain. As of 2016 the municipality has a population of 287 inhabitants. Its postal code is 37261.

References

Municipalities in the Province of Salamanca